Lumsden Beach is a resort village in the Canadian province of Saskatchewan, Canada, within Census Division No. 6. It is on the shores of Last Mountain Lake in the Rural Municipality of Lumsden No. 189.

History 
Lumsden Beach incorporated as a resort village on July 22, 1918.

Demographics 

Government 
The Resort Village of Lumsden Beach is governed by an elected municipal council and an appointed administrator. The mayor is Ross Wilson and its administrator is Robin Tinani.

See also 
List of communities in Saskatchewan
List of municipalities in Saskatchewan
List of resort villages in Saskatchewan
List of villages in Saskatchewan
List of summer villages in Alberta

References

External links 

Resort villages in Saskatchewan
Lumsden No. 189, Saskatchewan
Division No. 6, Saskatchewan